The 2017–18 season was Qarabağ's 25th Azerbaijan Premier League season, of which they were defending champions, and was their tenth season under manager Gurban Gurbanov.

Season overview

Transfers
Qarabağ announced their first summer signing on  6 June, Abbas Huseynov from Inter Baku, with Ukrainian goalkeeper Anton Kanibolotskiy signing a two-year contract from Shakhtar Donetsk on 24 June. In July, Qarabağ signed Jakub Rzeźniczak from Legia Warsaw and Wilde-Donald Guerrier from Alanyaspor.

Qarabağ finished off their signings for the summer with loan deals for Ramil Sheydayev, Pedro Henrique and Tarik Elyounoussi, on one-year contract from Trabzonspor, PAOK and Olympiacos respectively.

Squad

Out on loan

Transfers

In

Loans in

Out

Loans out

Released

Friendlies

Competitions

Premier League

Results summary

Results

League table

Azerbaijan Cup

UEFA Champions League

Qualifying rounds

Group stage

Squad statistics

Appearances and goals

|-
|colspan="14"|Players away on loan:

|-
|colspan="14"|Players who left Qarabağ during the season:

|}

Goal scorers

Disciplinary record

Notes

References

External links 
 Official Website

Qarabağ FK seasons
Qarabağ
Azerbaijani football clubs 2017–18 season